Jamaat-ul-Ahrar ("Assembly of the Free," abbreviated as JuA) was a terrorist organization that split away from Tehrik-i-Taliban Pakistan in August 2014. The group came to prominence after it claimed responsibility for the 2014 Wagah border suicide attack. In  October 2017, there were unconfirmed reports that Omar Khalid Khorasani, the leader of the JuA, had died from injuries sustained in a US drone strike in Paktia Province, Afghanistan. In August 2020, it merged back to TTP.

History

Roots and development
In September 2014, Tehrik-i-Taliban Pakistan chief Fazlullah ousted Mohmand Agency chief Omar Khalid Khorasani (former leader of Ahrar-ul-Hind). Omar Khalid Khorasani and his associates in Mohmand Agency had accused the TTP leadership of deviating from the TTP ideology, leading to the formation of splinter group TTP Jamaat-ul-Ahrar.

The Tehrik-i-Taliban Pakistan was effectively divided into two factions. The original TTP is headed by Fazlullah, who was elected in November 2013 following the killing of ex-chief Hakimullah Mehsud in a U.S. drone strike. In February 2014, Ahrar-ul-Hind, headed by Umar Qasmi (former leader in the Lashkar-e-Jhangvi) was formed after TTP opened peace talks with the Pakistani government. It later merged into Jamaat-ul-Ahrar, a second splinter group that broke away from Tehreek-i-Taliban in Pakistan on 4 September 2014, and named Omar Khalid Khorasani as its commander.

Relations with TTP
The group had announced they would no longer recognize or obey Mullah Fazlullah as their Emir. In March 2015, the group's spokesman announced that it swore loyalty to main TTP leadership again.

Designation as terrorist organization
On 6 July 2017, the Security Council’s 1267 Sanctions Committee approved the addition of Jamaat-ul-Ahrar in the list of entities and individuals subject to the assets freeze, travel ban and arms embargo. Pakistan had proposed this listing. It was designated as a Global Terrorist Organization under the SDN by the United States Department of the Treasury's Office of Foreign Assets Control, with addresses in Mohmand Tribal Agency, Bajaur Tribal Agency, Khyber Tribal Agency, Arakzai Tribal Agency, Charsadda, Peshawar, Swat, Punjab Province, Pakistan.

Organizational structure

Leaders
 Omar Khalid Khorasani (also known as Abdul Wali) previously led a faction called Ahrar-ul-Hind. He was also one of the founding members of the TTP and was a former journalist from Mohmand agency. It was reported that a JuA spokesman Asad Mansoor had told AFP news agency that Khorasani on 18 October 2017 had succumbed to his injuries received in a United States drone strike in Paktia Province of Afghanistan. Pajhwok Afghan News however stated that a source close to the group had denied his death. Long War Journal reported that a statement on Telegram issued under Khorasani's name denied his death, while confirming the death of Khalifa Umar Mansour. The outlet noted that the spokesman operating the group’s Telegram account did not announce his death. His death also was not confirmed by United States. Reports of Khorasani's death were proven false when the United States added Khorasani to the U.S State Department's Rewards for Justice wanted list on March 7, 2018. On 11 December 2020 Ziaulhaq Amarkhil the Governor of Nangarhar Province claimed on his Twitter account that Abdul Wali was killed by National Directorate of Security in the Chaparhar District although his death was not been confirmed by the United States. Abdul Wali was killed in a blast caused by a roadside mine on 7 August 2022 in Barmal District, Paktika Province, Afghanistan.

Spokesmen
 Asad Mansoor
Former
 Ehsanullah Ehsan, he surrendered himself to Pakistan's Security Forces in April 2017  and escaped from his detention in February 2020.

Operation Khyber-1

On 9 November, at least 13 militants were killed in security forces' offensive in Akakhel which included among the dead two suicide bombers and a key commander. Ehsan confirmed that their key commander Abu Jandal was killed during the 9 November bombing in Khyber Agency's Tirah Valley.

Claimed and alleged attacks

  2 November 2014, Jamaat-ul-Ahrar spokesman Ehsanullah Ehsan claimed responsibility for the  Wagah border attack in a telephone call to Dawn from Afghanistan. "Some other groups have claimed responsibility of this attack, but these claims are baseless. We will soon release the video of this attack," he said. "This attack is revenge for the killing of innocent people in North Waziristan."
  7 November 2014, Jamaat-ul-Ahrar claimed responsibility for twin bombings that killed at least six people in Mohmand Agency. The bombs targeted peace committee volunteers in Chinari village of Safi Tehsil. Ehsanullah Ehsan claimed responsibility and vowed to continue attacking tribal peace committees.
  21 November 2014, Jamaat-ul-Ahrar claimed responsibility for a grenade attack on the membership camp of Muttahida Qaumi Movement (MQM) in Orangi Town area of Karachi. Three members of the Sindh Assembly and 50 workers were injured.
 15 March 2015, Jamaat-ul-Ahrar claimed responsibility for twin bombings at a Roman Catholic church and Christ Church during Sunday service at Youhanabad town of Lahore. At least 15 people were killed and seventy were wounded in the attacks.
 7 March 2016, Jamaat-ul-Ahrar claimed responsibility for a suicide bombing that left 11 dead and 15 wounded after a man blew himself up outside a district court in the town of Shabqadar in the Charsadda District.
 27 March 2016, a spokesman for Taliban splinter group Tehreek-e-Taliban Pakistan Jamaatul Ahrar says: 'We proudly take responsibility for the suicide attack in a park in Lahore. Members of the Christian community who were celebrating Easter today were our prime target' but that 'we didn't want to kill women and children. Our target were male members of the Christian community'.   The nail-filled device near a children’s playground killed over 70 people, reportedly mostly Muslim.  It was described as an attempt by the group "to establish itself as the most aggressive and violent" Islamist group in Pakistan.
 On 16 September 2016, Jamaat-ul-Ahrar claimed the responsibility of suicide attack in a local mosque of Tehsil Amabar in Mohmand Agency, the attack killed at least 28 people and left 31 injured. In an emailed statement, TTP Jamaat-ul-Ahrar spokesperson, Ehsanullah Ehsan, said a suicide bomber targeted the peace committee.
 On 13 February 2017, Jamaat-ul-Ahrar claimed their involvement in a suicide attack targeting senior police officials at a protest on Lahore's Mall Road. The attack left 13 people dead and injured 31 others. The dead include 6 police officials, including DIG City Traffic Police Lahore Ahmad Mobin Zaidi and Acting DIG (Operations) Zahid Gondal. The terrorist outfit sent a text message to claim their responsibility and later released a video message to warn off future attacks.
 On 31 March 2017, Jamaat-ul-Ahraar claimed responsibility of an attack in Parachinar that killed 24 and injured 68 people.

Split

JuA was split into two groups, with a video statement on 12 November 2017 announcing that the Hizbul Ahrar group, formed in Nangarhar province of Afghanistan on 11 November, will be headed by militant commander Mukarram Khan. Khan had previously served as an important commander and spokesman of JuA. The statement said that Khan left JuA because of differences with its chief over "attacks against minority Christians, killing civilians, extortion, kidnapping for ransom and other acts he deemed un-Islamic". Since then, Hizbul Ahrar has claimed numerous attacks against police officers and army men, the modus operandi of the group is mainly targeted assassinations and IED blasts.

References

 
Jihadist groups in Pakistan
Organisations designated as terrorist by Pakistan
2014 establishments in Pakistan